Rodes Kirby Myers (June 29, 1900 – March 11, 1960) was an American politician who served as the 38th Lieutenant Governor of Kentucky 1939 to 1943.

Myers' hometown was Bowling Green, Kentucky. Myers was a Kentucky delegate to the Democratic National Convention in 1936, 1940, 1944, 1948 and 1956.

In 1939 Myers ran for Lieutenant Governor of Kentucky and won, serving 1939–43. Myers ran for Governor of Kentucky in 1943 but lost in the Democratic primary to J. Lyter Donaldson, who in turn lost to Republican Simeon S. Willis.

Myers died in 1960 and is buried at Fairview Cemetery in Bowling Green, Kentucky.

References

1900 births
1960 deaths
Lieutenant Governors of Kentucky
Politicians from Bowling Green, Kentucky
20th-century American politicians
Kentucky Democrats